These are the official results of the Men's Pole Vault event at the 1982 European Championships in Athens, Greece, held at Olympic Stadium "Spiros Louis" on 7 and 9 September 1982.

Medalists

Results

Final
9 September

Qualification
7 September

Participation
According to an unofficial count, 24 athletes from 11 countries participated in the event.

 (3)
 (1)
 (3)
 (4)
 (1)
 (1)
 (2)
 (3)
 (2)
 (2)
 (2)

See also
 1978 Men's European Championships Pole Vault (Prague)
 1980 Men's Olympic Pole Vault (Moscow)
 1983 Men's World Championships Pole Vault (Helsinki)
 1984 Men's Olympic Pole Vault (Los Angeles)
 1986 Men's European Championships Pole Vault (Stuttgart)
 1987 Men's World Championships Pole Vault (Rome)
 1988 Men's Olympic Pole Vault (Seoul)
 1990 Men's European Championships Pole Vault (Split)

References

 Results

Pole vault
Pole vault at the European Athletics Championships